Sumayyah is an Arabic-origin, feminine name. 

It may refer to:

People

Sumayyah 
 Sumayyah bint Khayyat (c.550-c.615), first Muslim to become a martyr

Sümeyye 
The Turkish version of Sumayyah.
 Sümeyye Boyacı (born 2003), Turkish female Paralympic swimmer
Sümeyye Erdoğan (born 1985), Turkish President Recep Tayyip Erdoğan's daughter
 Sümeyye Manz (born 1989), Turkish-German taekwondo practitioner
 Sümeyye Özcan (Paralympian) (born 1992), Turkish Paralympian athlete and goalball player

Places 

 Sumay-ye Beradust District, a district in Urmia County, West Azerbaijan Province, Iran.
 Sumay-ye Jonubi Rural District, a rural district in Urmia County, West Azerbaijan Province, Iran
 Sumay-ye Shomali Rural District, a rural district in Sumay-ye Beradust District, Urmia County, West Azerbaijan Province, Iran

See also